Arctopelopia is a genus of non-biting midges of the bloodworm family Chironomidae. The adipose tissue of the larvae of species in this genus are the host of Coccospora micrococcus, a microsporidium.

References 

Tanypodinae